Ganiyu Bolaji Oseni (born 19 September 1991) is a Nigerian professional footballer who plays as a forward for V.League 1 club Song Lam Nghe An.

Career
In his native Nigeria, Oseni started his career at Prime. He had a trial with Esperance Tunis on 29 March 2008 and played two CLP-1 games. He returned to Prime and was loaned out on 2 August 2008 to CSKA Moscow, after a successful trial in July 2008. In January 2009, he  joined CSKA on permanent transfer but left his club on 4 December 2009 for trials in Tunisia. He signed on 7 December 2009 a three-and-a-half year contract with his former club Esperance.

He went on loan to Kiên Giang in Vietnam in March 2011.

In October 2012, Oseni play for Hoang Anh Gia Lai of the V-League.

In April 2014, Oseni made his return to Vietnam when he signed with V.League 1 side Đồng Tâm Long An.

On 29 February 2020, he moved to the Armenian Premier League side Ararat Yerevan. In mid-August, he moved to Kuwaiti club Kazma SC, which he played for until his contract was terminated on 7 October 2020. At the end of December 2020, he signed a deal with Omani side Oman Club.

International career
In the 2007 FIFA U-17 World Cup in South Korea, Oseni played 6 matches and scored one goal as Nigeria won the tournament.
He was called up for the Nigeria U-23 All Africa Games qualifier in April 2011 and scored a brace in the 6-1 win over Liberia.

Honours and achievements

Club
Hà Nội
 V.League 1 (1): 2018
 Vietnamese Super Cup (1): 2018

International
Nigeria U17
 FIFA U-17 World Cup (1): 2007

Individual
Awards
V.League 1 Best Foreign Player of the Year: 2018

References

External links
 Ganiyu Oseni at Futbol.pl

1991 births
Living people
Sportspeople from Osogbo
Nigerian footballers
Nigerian expatriate footballers
Association football forwards
PFC CSKA Moscow players
Espérance Sportive de Tunis players
Osun United F.C. players
Hoang Anh Gia Lai FC players
Can Tho FC players
Kahramanmaraşspor footballers
Long An FC players
Becamex Binh Duong FC players
V.League 1 players
Hanoi FC players
FC Ararat Yerevan players
Kazma SC players
Oman Club players
Expatriate footballers in Russia
Expatriate footballers in Tunisia
Expatriate footballers in Vietnam
Expatriate footballers in Turkey
Expatriate footballers in Armenia
Expatriate footballers in Kuwait
Expatriate footballers in Oman
Nigerian expatriate sportspeople in Russia
Nigerian expatriate sportspeople in Tunisia
Nigerian expatriate sportspeople in Vietnam
Nigerian expatriate sportspeople in Turkey
Nigerian expatriate sportspeople in Armenia
Nigerian expatriate sportspeople in Kuwait
Nigerian expatriate sportspeople in Oman